The Monument of Liberty is a monument in Chişinău, Moldova.

Overview 

The monument is to be dedicated to the victims of 2009 Moldova civil unrest. Among the deaths were Valeriu Boboc, Ion Ţâbuleac, Eugen Ţapu, and Maxim Canişev.

External links
 Aşa va arăta Monumentul Libertăţii! 
 Guvernul Moldovei a hotărît să instaleze Monumentul Libertăţii 
 Autorul Monumentului Libertăţii: „Deputaţii vor trece ca prin vamă” 
 Aşa va arăta Monumentul Libertăţii! 
 Monumentul Libertăţii la Chişinău 
 The Monuments of Kishinev

Notes

Monuments and memorials in Chișinău
2010 in Moldova
2011 sculptures
Steel sculptures in Moldova